Gans may refer to:

 Gans, Oklahoma, town
 Gans, Pennsylvania, community
 Gans, Gironde, commune of the Gironde department, France

See also 
 Gans (surname), people with the surname Gans
 Generative adversarial networks (GANs), a class of artificial intelligence algorithms